Khun Pan is a Thai action fantasy thriller film released in 2016 based on the life story of Police Major General Khun Pantharak Ratchadet. The legendary sorcerer police officer, starring Ananda Everingham and Krissada Sukosol Clapp, directed by Kongkiat Khomsiri, had the sequel is Khun Pan 2.

Plot 
Year 1940, after successfully defeating Suea Krab Khamthong, the famous sorcerer thief, Police Lieutenant Khun Pantharak Ratchadet (Ananda Everingham) received a mission from Luang Adul (Santi Lun-pae), who was the Royal Police Director-general at the time to, investigate news of Al Hawi Yalu (inspired from, Awaesador Talae, the another famous sorcerer thief) a separatist sorcerer thief, the owner of the "tripartite" of rare 3 things believed to have magical powers. Khun Pan infiltrates a fishing village headed by Khai Tho and works in the ivory club of Luang Ohran, a corrupt civil servant who deceives Al Hawi Yalu for personal gain, Al Hawi Yalu asks the 2 police officers, who survived being ambushed by their own guerrillas and found that  There is also a police officer lurking in the area. Khun Pan traveled to meet with Al Hawi Yalu's father and found that in his childhood, Al Hawi Yalu had revered his father. But the loss of his mother in the turmoil between his father and the police made Al Hawi Yalu estranged from his father and hated the police very much. He set up guerrillas to rule the area of the Budo Mountains. Later, Khun Pan met Malai, who was Khai Tho's sister, before being attacked by Al Hawi Yalu's guerrillas Khun Pan was shot but escaped.

Release and reception
Khun Pan grossed a total of 61,743,275 baht, considered the third highest grossing movie of 2016.

Khun Pan won the Best Supporting Actor (Krissada Sukosol Clapp), Best Visual Effects, Best Costume Design, and Best Makeup Effects at the 26th Suphannahong National Film Awards. It was screened at the 2018 New York Asian Film Festival in its Secret Screening event. V.N. Pryor, reviewing the film on Cinapse, called it a "deeply, deeply strange movie," and said that "[it] frickin’ moves."

References 

2010s Thai films
Thai science fiction action films